Zhou Xuechang (Hepburn: Shu Gakushō; March 19, 1898) – November 27, 1952) was a politician in the Republic of China. He was an important figure during the Reorganized National Government of China. His courtesy name was Zhihou.

Biography
Zhou was born in Anxin, Zhili (Now Hebei). He graduated from Peking University and Guangdong University. In 1925, he became an instructor at the Whampoa Military Academy. Zhou Xuechang successively held the positions of Political Chief of the 2nd Division in the East Route Army of the Northern Expedition, Chairman of the Kuomintang's Central Committee and Leading Member of the Beiping (Peking) Branch of the Kuomintang, etc. In 1931, he was appointed to the Chief of the Bureau for Education of the Beiping City Government. In next October, he was appointed to the Committee of the Shanxi Provincial Government. In 1938, he became Member of the Preparatory committee for Xikang Province.

From August 1939, Zhou Xuechang joined Wang Jingwei in creating the collaborationist Reorganized National Government of China, and was appointed Member of the Kuomintang's Central Committee (Wang clique). In next September, he was appointed Superintendent of Education of the Training Team for Central Political Affairs. In December 1941, he was promoted to Mayor of the Nanjing Special City, and stayed on this position until the Wang Jingwei regime collapsed.

After the  Reorganized National Government of China  collapsed, on August 17, 1945, the former Director of the Taxation Police Bureau Zhou Gao who was a subordinate of Zhou Fohai suddenly started arresting important members of the former government. However, the Vice-Chief of Staff of the China Expeditionary Army , Takeo Imai urged that Zhou Gao to release his captives, so Zhou Xuechang was also set free.

On September 26 the same year, Zhou Xuechang was arrested by Chiang Kai-shek's National Government. On October 19, 1945 he was convicted of treason and surrender to the enemy and was sentenced to death. In May 1947, his sentence was confirmed by the higher court. However, the Chinese Civil War occurred before his sentence could be carried out, and in January 1949, he was transferred to the Tilanqiao Prison in Shanghai. After the People's Republic of China had been established, his treatment did not change, and he remained imprisoned to his death of illness on November 27, 1952.

References

Footnotes
 
 Zheng Renjia, "The biographical sketch of Zhou Xuechang" Biographical Writings Website (requires a Traditional Chinese font)
 
 
 

1898 births
1952 deaths
Politicians from Baoding
Chinese prisoners sentenced to death
Republic of China politicians from Hebei
Chinese collaborators with Imperial Japan
Kuomintang collaborators with Imperial Japan
Prisoners and detainees of the People's Republic of China
Prisoners sentenced to death by China
Prisoners who died in Chinese detention
Mayors of Nanjing
National University of Peking alumni